The 1998 Major League Baseball postseason was the playoff tournament of Major League Baseball for the 1998 season. The winners of the League Division Series would move on to the League Championship Series to determine the pennant winners that face each other in the World Series. This was the first postseason in which teams were seeded by their respective win–loss record within their respective leagues. 

In the American League, the New York Yankees and Cleveland Indians returned to the postseason for the fourth year in a row, the Boston Red Sox returned to the postseason for the third time this decade, and the Texas Rangers returned to the postseason for the second time in three years. 

In the National League, the Atlanta Braves made their seventh straight postseason appearance, the Chicago Cubs returned to the postseason for the first time since 1989, the San Diego Padres were making their second appearance in the past three years, and the Houston Astros returned for the second year in a row, marking the first time that both Texas MLB teams made the postseason.

The postseason began on September 29, 1998, and ended on October 21, 1998, with the 114-win New York Yankees sweeping the San Diego Padres in the 1998 World Series. It was the Yankees' 24th championship in franchise history, tying the Montreal Canadiens for the most championship wins in North American sports.

Playoff seeds
This was the first postseason in which teams were seeded by their respective win–loss record within their respective leagues.
 Division Champions were seeded 1–3.
 Wild Cards were automatically seeded 4 (regardless of having a better record than a Division Champion).
 The team with the better regular season record in the first two rounds had home-field advantage, with the wild card never having home-field until the World Series.
 The Division Series pitted the No. 1 seeded Division Champion against the No. 4 seeded Wild Card, while the No. 2 seeded faced the No. 3 seeded Division Champion.
 If the No. 1 seeded Division Champion and the Wild Card were in the same division, the No. 1 seeded Division Champion would instead face the No. 3 seeded Division Champion while the No. 2 seeded Division Champion would face the No. 4 seeded Wild Card.
 Home-field advantage in the World Series was still based on yearly rotation at this time (until that changed in 2003, and again in 2017).
 This was also the first season in which the Division Series was conducted under a 2–2–1 format. The higher seed hosted Games 1–2, and 5 (if necessary). The lower seeded team hosted Games 3 and 4 (Game 4, if necessary). Previously, the team with home-field advantage in all best-of-5 postseason series (LCS from 1969–1984, LDS from 1981, 1995–1997) were conducted in a 2–3 format where the team with home-field advantage opened on the road for the first two games, while hosting the final three games (if Games 4 & 5 are necessary).

The following teams qualified for the postseason:

American League
 New York Yankees - 114–48, Clinched AL East
 Cleveland Indians - 89–73, Clinched AL Central
 Texas Rangers - 88–74, Clinched AL West
 Boston Red Sox - 92–70, Clinched Wild Card

National League
 Atlanta Braves - 106–56, Clinched NL East
 Houston Astros - 102–60, Clinched NL Central
 San Diego Padres - 98–64, Clinched NL West
 Chicago Cubs - 90–73, Clinched Wild Card

Playoff bracket

American League Division Series

(1) New York Yankees vs. (3) Texas Rangers 

This was the second postseason meeting between the Yankees and Rangers. They last met in the 1996 ALDS, which the Yankees won in four games. The Yankees swept the Rangers to return to the ALCS for the second time in three years. This series was not close - the Yankees held the Rangers to only one run scored throughout the entire series.

The Yankees and Rangers would meet again the next year, which also ended in a Yankees sweep. It would be in 2010 that the Rangers would finally break through against the Yankees.

(2) Cleveland Indians vs. (4) Boston Red Sox 

This was the second postseason meeting between the Red Sox and Indians. They last met in the ALDS in 1995, which was won by the Indians. The Indians once again defeated the Red Sox to return to the ALCS for the third time in four years. Despite a blowout win by the Red Sox in Game 1, the Indians would the next three games to advance to the next round.

Both teams would meet again in the 1999 ALDS, 2007 ALCS, and 2016 ALDS, with the Red Sox winning the former two, and the Indians winning the latter.

National League Division Series

(1) Atlanta Braves vs. (4) Chicago Cubs 

This was the first postseason meeting between the Braves and Cubs. The Braves swept the Cubs to advance to the NLCS for a record seventh year in a row. The Braves blew out the Cubs in Game 1 thanks to a stellar pitching performance from John Smoltz, while the Braves prevailed in an extra-inning Game 2 to go up 2-0 in the series headed to Chicago. The Braves took Game 3 by a 6-2 score to advance. 

Both teams would meet again in the postseason in 2003, where the Cubs defeated the Braves in the NLDS to win their first postseason series since 1908.

(2) Houston Astros vs. (3) San Diego Padres 

The Padres upset the team with the MLB's best offense in the Astros in four games to advance to the NLCS for the first time since 1984. 

The Padres took Game 1 on the road against Astros' ace Randy Johnson, winning their first road playoff game in franchise history. The Astros evened the series with a 5-4 victory in Game 2. When the series moved to San Diego for Game 3, the Padres' Jim Leyritz hit a solo home run in the bottom of the seventh to secure the win. In Game 4, the Padres closed out the series by handing Johnson yet another loss in a 6-1 victory.

This was the last time the Padres won in the NLDS until 2022.

American League Championship Series

(1) New York Yankees vs. (2) Cleveland Indians 

This was the second postseason meeting between the Indians and Yankees. The Indians took a 2-1 series lead, but they were unable to maintain it, as the Yankees defeated the Indians in six games to return to the World Series for the second time in three years. Both teams would meet again in the ALDS in 2007 and 2017, the 2020 AL Wild Card Series, and the ALDS again in 2022 (result to be determined), with Cleveland winning the former, and the Yankees winning the latter three.

The Indians would return to the ALCS in 2007, but they blew a 3-1 series lead and fell to the Boston Red Sox in seven games. The Yankees would win the AL pennant again the next year, defeating their archrival in the Red Sox in five games.

National League Championship Series

(1) Atlanta Braves vs. (3) San Diego Padres 

The Padres upset the NL-best Braves in six games to return to the World Series for the first time since 1984. 

The Padres stole Games 1 and 2 on the road to go up 2-0 in the series headed to San Diego, capped off by the Padres' Kevin Brown pitching a complete game shutout in Game 2. The Padres then went up 3-0 in the series with a 4-1 victory in Game 4. While the Braves attempted to rally by taking Games 4 and 5 to send the series back to Atlanta, the Padres clinched the pennant with a 5-0 shutout in Game 6. 

Until 2020, this was the last playoff series win by the Padres. As of 2022, this is the last time that the Padres won the NL pennant.

The Braves would return to the NLCS again next year, and defeated the New York Mets in six games to return to the World Series. The Padres would eventually return to the NLCS in 2022, but were defeated by the Philadelphia Phillies in five games, who made a Cinderella run to the World Series.

1998 World Series

(AL1) New York Yankees vs. (NL3) San Diego Padres 

The Yankees handily swept the Padres to win their second title in three years. The Yankees prevailed in an offensive duel in Game 1, and then blew out the Padres in Game 2 to go up 2-0 in the series headed to San Diego. In Game 3, the Padres held a 3-2 lead going into the eighth, but the Yankees went on a 3-1 run in the inning to prevail 5-4 and go up 3-0 in the series. Andy Pettitte and Mariano Rivera helped the Yankees shut out the Padres in Game 4 to complete the sweep and clinch the title.

After the series win, the Yankees would eventually complete a three-peat, winning again in 1999 and 2000. The Padres would not return to the postseason again until 2005.

As of 2022, this is the last championship round in either one of the four major North American sports leagues to feature a team from San Diego. This was the last postseason series ever played at Qualcomm Stadium.

References

External links
 League Baseball Standings & Expanded Standings - 1998

 
Major League Baseball postseason